Sharkbite Sessions is an EP released in 2005 by Ted Leo and the Pharmacists. During their late 2004 tour promoting the Shake the Sheets album, the band stopped over at Sharkbite Studios in Oakland, CA.  There, the band—along with Ryan Massey of Communiqué—recorded full-band versions of two songs featured on 2003's Tell Balgeary, Balgury Is Dead EP and one that has become a staple of the Pharmacists' live sets.

"Six Months in a Leaky Boat" and "Suspect Device" are covers, originally written and performed by Split Enz and Stiff Little Fingers, respectively.  The EP is only available for paid download from the iTunes Music Store, using the Emusic.com service, and Amazon.com.

Track listing
"Loyal to My Sorrowful Country" – 2:22
"Six Months in a Leaky Boat" – 4:10
"Suspect Device" – 2:44

References

Ted Leo and the Pharmacists albums
2005 EPs